Gianmarco Ingrosso (born 28 January 1989) is an Italian professional footballer who plays as a defender for Pescara on loan from Pisa.

Career
Ingrosso made his Serie A debut for his native club Lecce on 31 May 2009, when he started in a 4–1 defeat to Genoa.

In January 2010 Ingrosso was signed by Paganese in a temporary deal. On 9 August 2010 the deal was extended, which the club also signed Vittorio Triarico.

On 14 July 2015 Ingrosso was signed by Matera.

On 12 September 2020, he went to Cosenza on loan.

On 13 August 2021, he joined Pescara on loan.

References

External links

1989 births
Sportspeople from the Province of Lecce
Living people
Italian footballers
Association football defenders
Serie B players
Serie C players
U.S. Lecce players
Paganese Calcio 1926 players
L'Aquila Calcio 1927 players
Matera Calcio players
Pisa S.C. players
Ascoli Calcio 1898 F.C. players
Calcio Foggia 1920 players
Cosenza Calcio players
Delfino Pescara 1936 players
Footballers from Apulia
21st-century Italian people